Lorentino d'Andrea (c.1430–1506), was an Italian fresco painter active in Arezzo.	
	
According to the RKD he is only known for his religious works in Arezzo.

References	
	
	

1430s births
1506 deaths
15th-century Italian painters
Italian male painters
16th-century Italian painters
People from Arezzo
Painters from Tuscany